Christina Anne Boswell  (b. 1972) is a political scholar. She is a Professor of Politics and the Dean of Research in the College of Arts, Humanities & Social Sciences at the University of Edinburgh.

Biography
Boswell was born in London and attended the Sacred Heart High School in Hammersmith. She completed undergraduate studies in Philosophy, Politics and Economics at Balliol College, Oxford and a MSc in Public Administration at the College of Europe. In 2001 she gained her PhD in International Relations from the London School of Economics.

She worked in Hamburg as a postdoctoral research fellow between 2000 - 2006, before joining the University of Edinburgh in 2006 where she has held several research leadership roles including Dean of Research for Arts, Humanities and Social Sciences.

In 2020 Her 2018 monograph Manufacturing Political Trust: Targets and Performance Measurement in Public Policy was awarded the Mackenzie Book Prize from the Political Studies Association. Her 2012 publication The Political Uses of Expert Knowledge: Immigration Policy and Social Research was awarded the American Political Science Association Prize for the category of 'Best Book on Ideas, Knowledge and Policy'.

Boswell was elected a Fellow of the Royal Society of Edinburgh in 2017. In 2019 she was elected as a Fellow of the Academy of Social Sciences and as a Fellow of the British Academy. Between 2018-21 Boswell chaired the Scottish Government's Expert Advisory Group on Migration and Population. Since 2021 she has held the role of Vice President for Public Policy of the British Academy.

Select publications
Boswell, C. 2018. Manufacturing Political Trust: Targets and Performance Measurement in Public Policy. Cambridge University Press.
Boswell, C. The Political Uses of Expert Knowledge: Immigration Policy and Social Research Cambridge University Press.
Boswell, C. and Geddes, A. 2011. Migration and Mobility in the European Union. Palgrave
Boswell, C. 2005. The Ethics of Refugee Policy. Routledge.
Boswell, C. 2003. European Migration Policies in Flux. Routledge.

References

1972 births
Living people
Fellows of the British Academy
Fellows of the Royal Society of Edinburgh
Fellows of the Academy of Social Sciences
Alumni of the London School of Economics
Alumni of Balliol College, Oxford
College of Europe alumni